Chintu Television is a 24-hour Kannada-English kids pay television channel from Sun TV Network in India. The target audience is children aged between 3 and 14. It was launched on 11 April 2009; making it Sun TV Network's first ever Kannada children's television channel.

CHINTU TV is a free-to-air channel available on most local cable television networks. On the DTH platform, the channel is available on Sun Direct in India via Channel 260.

It broadcasts international shows dubbed into Kannada and English, which are given local resonance and regional flavour.

Currently broadcasting
 Oggy and the Cockroaches
 The Spectacular Spiderman
 He-Man
 Ammu and Friends
 Pink Panther
 Bernard
 Amar Chitra Katha
 Little Krishna
 Kikoriki
 Tian tian
 Baalveer
 Luv Kush
 Dora the Explorer
 Booine Bears
 Shane the Chef
 Little Krishna
 Olive and the Moon

Upcoming programs 

 Baal Veer
 Pinkalicious & Peterrific
 Baalveer Returns

Formerly broadcasting
 Godzilla: The Series
 Jackie Chan Adventures
 Zorro: Generation Z
 Invader Zim
 Maya Jagattu
 Heidi
 SpongeBob SquarePants
 Harry Mattu Dinosaurs
 The Penguins of Madagascar
 Avatar
 Men In Black
 Stuart Little
 Sinbad
 Saavirada Ondu Raathrigalu
 Krypto
 Kung Fu Panda: Legends of Awesomeness
 Horrid Henry
 Barney & Friends
 Master Raindrop
 Pinky And The Brain
 Mayakannu
 Teletubbies (Original)

See also
 Sun Group
 Sun TV Network
 List of Kannada-language television channels

References

External links
 Official Website 
 Sun TV Network Website
 Sun Group Website

Children's television channels in India
Kannada-language television channels
Television channels and stations established in 2009
Sun Group
Television stations in Bangalore
2009 establishments in Karnataka